Leupold & Stevens, Inc. is an American manufacturer of telescopic sights, red dot sights, binoculars, rangefinders, spotting scopes, and eyewear located in Beaverton, Oregon, United States. The company, started in 1907, is on its fifth generation of family ownership.

History
Leupold & Stevens was founded by the German immigrant Markus Friedrich (Fred) Leupold and his brother-in-law Adam Voelpel in 1907, under the name Leupold & Voelpel. At the time, the company specialized in the repair of survey equipment. In 1911, Leupold & Voelpel was contracted by John Cyprian (J.C.) Stevens to manufacture a water level recorder he had designed and patented. After the initial success of the product, he was made partner in 1914 and the company was renamed Leupold, Voelpel, and Co. Besides the first water level recorder, the company invented several other innovative pieces of equipment, such as the Telemark water recorder which was patented in 1939. This device could transmit water level information via telephone, allowing for remote monitoring of water resources to become feasible.

In 1942, the company name was changed to its present form, Leupold & Stevens. Surveying equipment, rifle scopes, and related products are sold under the "Leupold" name, while water monitoring instrumentation, such as level and flow recorders, are marketed under the "Stevens" brand.

After World War II Leupold & Stevens began making gun scopes after Marcus Leupold failed to hit a deer with his rifle. His scope fogged up and he is reported to have exclaimed "Hell! I could build a better scope than this!" as the deer bounded off. In 1962, Leupold invented the Duplex Reticle, which most riflescopes now use. By 1979, Leupold scopes were generating twice the total revenue of Stevens instruments.

In 1969, the company acquired a majority interest in the company Nosler Bullets (also a family company), and then sold off their portion in 1988.  Other ventures include Biamp Systems (1985–1986), makers of sound equipment, and Fabmark (1984–1990), a sheet metal fabrication division that serviced high technology companies.

By 1996, the company had sales of $100 million. In 1998, the water monitoring portion of Leupold & Stevens was spun off into its own privately held Portland-based business, Stevens Water Monitoring Systems, inc., with Leupold & Stevens also retaining the "Stevens" name as part of their corporate identity. In 2002, Leupold & Stevens won a Wausau Insurance Gold Award for workplace safety at the company's factory. By 2006, the company employed 600 people at its Beaverton facility. The company is now in its fifth generation of ownership.

In 2008, Leupold & Stevens purchased Redfield Optics along with its brand name and all intellectual property rights.  In 2010, the company added almost 100 employees, bringing total employment to almost 700 by November of that year.  In late 2010, a Portland Business Journal article gave the company's annual revenue as approximately $160 million, citing Reference.com for the estimate.

A new chief executive, Bruce Pettet, was named in February 2014. The 2014 NRA National Championship equipment survey listed Leupold as the most popular scope manufacturer for both the high power and high power hunter competition.

Products
Leupold currently produces telescopic sights, red dot sights, binoculars, rangefinders, spotting scopes, and eyewear products in addition to scope mounts, apparel, and accessories. In 2020, Leupold launched a virtual factory tour.

Riflescopes

 VX-6HD
 VX-5HD
 VX-3i LRP
 VX-3i
 VX-Freedom
 FX Series (fixed power)
 Competition
 Rifleman
 Mark 8
 Mark 6
 Mark 5HD
 D-EVO

Red Dot Sights

 Freedom Red Dot Sight (RDS)
 Leupold Carbine Optic (LCO)
 DeltaPoint Pro

Binoculars

 BX-5 Santiam HD
 BX-4 Pro Guide HD
 BX-T HD
 BX-2 Alpine
 BX-1 McKenzie
 BX-1 Yosemite
 BX-1 Rogue

Spotting Scopes

 SX-5 Santiam HD
 SX-4 Pro Guide HD
 Gold Ring
 Mark 4
 SX-2 Alpine HD
 SX-1 Ventana

Rangefinders

 RX-2800
 RX-1600i
 RX-1300i
 RX-FullDraw4
 RX-FullDraw3
 RX-950

Mounts

 Standard (STD)
 Dual Dovetail (DD)
 Quick Release (QR)
 Cross Slot (PRW2/QRW2/LRW)
 Backcountry
 Ringmounts
 Mark 4
 Integrated Mounting System (IMS)
 Rifleman
 DeltaPoint

Eyewear

 Tracer
 Packout
 Becnara
 Katmai
 Switchback
 Payload
 Refuge
 Cheyenne

Military contracts

The company's riflescopes are used by organizations such as the United States Army, the Secret Service and the Navy SEALs. The United States Navy and the Marine Corps also use their scopes.

 1988–2014 | M24
 1989–present | M107 – Mark 4 LR/T 4.5-14x50mm
 2002–present | MK12 Special Purpose Rifle (SPR) – Mark 4 MR/T 2.5-8x36mm TS-30 A2
 2004–present | MK14 Enhanced Battle Rifle – Mark 4 LR/T 3.5-10x40mm
 2008–2019 | M110 Semi-Automatic Sniper System – Mark 4 LR/T 3.5-10x40mm
 2010–present | M151 Scout Sniper Observation Telescopes (SSOT) – Mark 4 12-40X60mm Spotting Scope
 2010–present | M2010 – Mark 4 ER/T 6.5-20x50mm M5A2
 2011–present | Classified – Mark 8 1.1-8x24mm CQBSS
 2011–present | Heavy Day Optic (HDO) – Mark 8 1.1-8x24mm CQBSS
 2013–present | Enhanced Combat Optical Sight-Optimized (ECOS-O) – Mark 6 3-18x44mm
 2020–present | M110 Semi-Automatic Sniper System – Mark 5HD 3.6-18x44
 2020–present | MK22 Mod 0 Precision Sniper Rifle – Mark 5HD 5-25x56

See also
 List of companies based in Oregon

References

External links

Companies based in Washington County, Oregon
Optics manufacturing companies
Privately held companies based in Oregon
Technology companies established in 1907
1907 establishments in Oregon